Tnjri (from տնջրի tnǰri, which in the Karabakh dialect means ‘plane tree’) is a -year-old giant Oriental plane tree situated nearby the village of Skhtorashen, de facto in the Martuni Province of the Republic of Artsakh, de jure in the Khojavend District of Azerbaijan. 

The hollow of the tree is 44 sq.m., where more than 40 people can stand. The area covered by the foliage of the tree is 1400 sq.m. The circumference of the tree is 27 m and the height is more than 54 m which can be compared with an 18-story building. The tree is situated on a valley not far from the village and stands the Tengru spring, which is the main source of irrigation for the tree.

The tree has been visited by many famous people - such as the inventor of the Armenian alphabet Mesrop Mashtots (5th century AD), the first Armenian historian Movses Khorenatsi (5th century AD), and musician and poet Sayat-Nova (18th century). Every year thousands of pilgrims and tourists who visit Artsakh also come to visit the Tnjri chinar (platanus in Armenian) tree. Tnjri serves as a local shrine.

Gallery

References 

Individual plane trees
Tourist attractions in the Republic of Artsakh
Individual trees in Azerbaijan
Tourist attractions in Azerbaijan